Ján Varholík (born 28 February 1970) is a Slovak ice hockey player. He competed in the men's tournaments at the 1994 Winter Olympics and the 1998 Winter Olympics.

Career statistics

Regular season and playoffs

International

References

External links
 

1970 births
Living people
Olympic ice hockey players of Slovakia
Ice hockey players at the 1994 Winter Olympics
Ice hockey players at the 1998 Winter Olympics
Sportspeople from Košice
HC Košice players
Czechoslovak ice hockey defencemen
Slovak ice hockey defencemen